Yoho or Yo Ho may refer to:

Yoho Ahoy, British children's television series
Yoho National Park in British Columbia, Canada
Yoho Lake in New Brunswick, Canada
Yoho Mall in Yuen Long, Hong Kong
Yoho Town in Yuen Long, Hong Kong
Yo Ho (A Pirate's Life for Me), the theme song for the Pirates of the Caribbean attractions at Disney theme parks
USS Yo Ho (SP-463), a patrol vessel that served in the United States Navy from 1917 to 1919

People with the surname
Mack Yoho, American football player
Monte Yoho, American southern rock and country musician
Ted Yoho, American politician